Events in the year 1967 in the Republic of India.

Incumbents
 President of India – Sarvepalli Radhakrishnan until 13 May, Zakir Hussain
 Prime Minister of India – Indira Gandhi
 Chief Justice of India – Koka Subba Rao (until 11 April), Kailas Nath Wanchoo (starting 11 April)

Governors
 Andhra Pradesh – Pattom A. Thanu Pillai 
 Assam – Vishnu Sahay
 Bihar – M. A. S. Ayyangar (until 7 December), Nityanand Kanungo (starting 7 December)
 Gujarat – 
 until 7 December: Nityanand Kanungo 
 7 December-26 December: P.N. Bhagwati 
 starting 26 December: Shriman Narayan
 Haryana – Dharma Vira (until 14 September), Birendra Narayan Chakraborty (starting 14 September)
 Jammu and Kashmir – Mahraja Karan Singh (until 15 May), Bhagwan Sahay (starting 15 May)
 Karnataka – V. V. Giri (until 13 May), Gopal Swarup Pathak (starting 13 May)
 Kerala – Bhagwan Sahay (until 15 May), V. Viswanathan (starting 15 May)
 Madhya Pradesh – K. Chengalaraya Reddy 
 Maharashtra – P V Cherian 
 Nagaland – Vishnu Sahay 
 Odisha – Ajudhia Nath Khosla 
 Punjab – 
 until 1 June: Dharma Vira
 1 June-16 October: Mehar Singh 
 starting 16 October: Dadappa Chintappa Pavate
 Rajasthan – Sampurnanand (until 16 April), Sardar Hukam Singh (starting 16 April)
 Uttar Pradesh – Bishwanath Das (until 30 April), Dr. Bezwada Gopala Reddy (starting 1 May)
 West Bengal – Padmaja Naidu (until 1 June), Dharma Vira (starting 1 June)

Events
 National income - 376,012 million
 13 May – Zakir Hussain is the first Muslim to become president of India.
 12 May – Congress Working Committee adopted a resolution for social control of banks, nationalization of general insurance, removal of princes privileges.
 27 May – Guerrilla War: Beginning with a peasant uprising in the town of Naxalbari, this Marxist/Maoist rebellion sputters on in the Indian countryside. The guerrillas operate among the impoverished peasants, fighting both the government security forces and private paramilitary groups funded by wealthy landowners. Most fighting takes place in the states of Andhra Pradesh, Maharashtra, Orissa and Madhya Pradesh.
 11 September – Indian and Chinese troops begin to exchange fire at Nathu La in Sikkim. This event is known as the Nathu La and Cho La clashes.
 15 September –  After a ceasefire, the clashes in Nathu La end.
 1 October – Indian and Chinese troops clash in Cho la and the duel ended after a day.   
 11 December – The 6.6  Koynanagar earthquake shook western India with a maximum Mercalli intensity of VIII (Severe), killing 177–180 and injuring 2,272.

Law
Unlawful Activities Prevention Act 1967

Sport
Prithipal Singh and Shankar Lakshman (hockey players) are awarded the Padma Shri.

Births

January to June
6 January  A. R. Rahman, music composer and singer.
15 January – Bhanupriya, actress.
12 February – N. Ravikiran, composer of Carnatic music.
3 March - Shankar Mahadevan,
Singer. 
15 May – Madhuri Dixit, actress.
23 May  Rahman, actor.
1 June – Anil Bhardwaj, scientist.
12 June – Muttamsetti Srinivasa Rao , politician and member of parliament from Anakapalli.

July to December
7 July – Pratyaya Amrit, IAS
14 July – Prakash Kona, novelist, essayist and poet.
27 July – Rahul Bose, actor, screenwriter, film director and social activist.
4 August – Arbaaz Khan, actor.
9 September – Akshay Kumar, actor.
12 September  Amala Akkineni, actress.
30 September – Deepti Bhatnagar, actress and television presenter.
13 November – Juhi Chawla, actress, film producer and television presenter.
17 December – Neeraj Mittal, IAS

Full date unknown
Sanjana Kapoor, actress and theatre director.

Deaths
22 January – Pandurang Sadashiv Khankhoje, revolutionary, scholar, agricultural scientist and historian (b. 1884).
28 November – Senapati Bapat, Activist in the Indian Independence Movement and the Samyukta Maharashtra Movement (b. 1880)
Krishna Hutheesing, political activist and writer (b. 1907).

See also 
 Bollywood films of 1967

References

 
India
Years of the 20th century in India